The 1947 South Australian National Football League season was the 68th season of the top-level Australian rules football competition in South Australia.

Ladder

Finals series

Grand Final

References 

 https://web.archive.org/web/20141115040811/http://australianfootball.com/seasons/season/SANFL/1989/basic

South Australian National Football League seasons
SANFL